The Cook Islands Rugby Union is the governing body for rugby union in the Cook Islands. It was founded in 1989 and became affiliated to the International Rugby Board in 1995.

The Cook Islands Rugby Union are also members of the Pacific Islands Rugby Alliance.

See also
 Cook Islands national rugby union team
 Rugby union in the Cook Islands

External links
 Cook Islands Rugby Union – Official Site 

Rugby union in the Cook Islands
Rugby union governing bodies in Oceania
Sports organizations established in 1989
1989 establishments in the Cook Islands
Rugby U